Pedro Montalvo Gómez (born 2 June 1968) is a Mexican politician from the Institutional Revolutionary Party. From 2006 to 2009 he served as Deputy of the LX Legislature of the Mexican Congress representing Veracruz, and previously served as municipal president of Omealca.

References

1968 births
Living people
Politicians from Veracruz
Institutional Revolutionary Party politicians
21st-century Mexican politicians
Municipal presidents in Veracruz
Deputies of the LX Legislature of Mexico
Members of the Chamber of Deputies (Mexico) for Veracruz